Worth County is a county located in the U.S. state of Iowa. As of the 2020 census, the population was 7,443. The county seat is Northwood. The county was founded in 1851 and named for Major General William Jenkins Worth (1794–1849), an officer in both the Seminole War and the Mexican–American War.

Worth County is part of the Mason City, IA Micropolitan Statistical Area.

Geography
It is the fourth-smallest county in Iowa by land area and third-smallest by total area.

Major highways
   Interstate 35/Iowa Highway 27
  U.S. Highway 65
  U.S. Highway 69
  Iowa Highway 9

Adjacent counties
 Freeborn County, Minnesota (north)
 Mower County, Minnesota (northeast)
 Mitchell County (east)
 Cerro Gordo County (south)
 Winnebago County (west)

Demographics

2020 census
There were 3,480 housing units, of which 3,127 were occupied.

2010 census
There were 3,548 housing units, of which 3,172 were occupied.

2000 census

At the 2000 census there were 7,909 people, 3,278 households, and 2,265 families in the county. The population density was 20 people per square mile (8/km2). There were 3,534 housing units at an average density of 9 per square mile (3/km2).  The racial makeup of the county was 98.37% White, 0.28% Black or African American, 0.09% Native American, 0.14% Asian, 0.01% Pacific Islander, 0.42% from other races, and 0.70% from two or more races. 1.57%. were Hispanic or Latino of any race.

Of the 3,278 households 30.40% had children under the age of 18 living with them, 58.10% were married couples living together, 7.30% had a female householder with no husband present, and 30.90% were non-families. 27.60% of households were one person and 14.30% were one person aged 65 or older. The average household size was 2.38 and the average family size was 2.88.

The age distribution was 24.30% under the age of 18, 6.50% from 18 to 24, 26.30% from 25 to 44, 23.50% from 45 to 64, and 19.40% 65 or older. The median age was 41 years. For every 100 females, there were 98.50 males. For every 100 females age 18 and over, there were 95.20 males.

The median household income was $36,444 and the median family income  was $41,763. Males had a median income of $27,927 versus $20,897 for females. The per capita income for the county was $16,952.  About 6.30% of families and 8.30% of the population were below the poverty line, including 9.60% of those under age 18 and 7.80% of those age 65 or over.

Communities

Cities
 Fertile
 Grafton
 Hanlontown
 Joice
 Kensett
 Manly
 Northwood

Census-designated place
 Bolan

Townships

 Barton
 Bristol
 Brookfield
 Danville
 Deer Creek
 Fertile
 Grove
 Hartland
 Kensett
 Lincoln
 Silver Lake
 Union

Population ranking
The population ranking of the following table is based on the 2020 census of Worth County.

† county seat

Politics

See also

 Worth County Courthouse
 National Register of Historic Places listings in Worth County, Iowa

References

External links

 County Government website 

 
1851 establishments in Iowa
Mason City, Iowa micropolitan area
Populated places established in 1851